Robert Wylie (27 April 1948 – 8 September 2015) was a New Zealand cricketer. He played five first-class matches for Central Districts in 1973/74.

References

External links
 

1948 births
2015 deaths
New Zealand cricketers
Central Districts cricketers
Cricketers from Lower Hutt